The Way It Was is the second studio album by American pop rock band Parachute, released by Island Def Jam Music Group on May 17, 2011. The album debuted at number 19 on the Billboard 200 chart, number 7 on the Rock Albums chart and number 4 on the Digital Albums chart. The band tested new songs "What I Know", "White Dress", "Halfway",  "Square One", "Break My Heart for Me" and "Something to Believe in" during their 2010 fall tour. On December 4, 2010, Parachute released a viral video on ESPN and ABC for "Something to Believe in".

Leading up to the release of The Way It Was Parachute released the singles "Kiss Me Slowly" co-written by Dave Haywood and Charles Kelley of Lady Antebellum, "You and Me" exclusively on iTunes and "Halfway" on Amazon. Released May 17, 2011, The Way It Was was featured as a New Release on iTunes and the single "What I Know" was a free track available for exclusive download for release week. The album's title comes from a lyric in "What I Know".

Track listing

Charts

Personnel
 John Fields - guitar, keyboards, programming
 Will Anderson - lead vocals, guitar, keyboards
 Alex Hargrave - vocals, bass
 Johnny Stubblefield - vocals, drums, percussion
 Kit French - vocals, saxophone, keyboards
 Nate McFarland - vocals, guitar

References

2011 albums
Parachute (band) albums
Albums produced by John Fields (record producer)